Young and Dangerous is a 1957 American drama film directed by William F. Claxton and written by James Landis. The film stars Lili Gentle, Mark Damon, Edward Binns, Frances Mercer, George Brenlin and Connie Stevens. The film was released on October 30, 1957, by 20th Century Fox.

Plot
Rosemary Clinton's parents are displeased by her interest in a boy, Tommy Price, who, although a doctor's son, has a reputation as a juvenile delinquent.

Making a bet with his friends that Rosemary will grant him her favors, Tommy chases her under a pier and is arrested by police. His disappointed parents must bail Tommy out of jail, while the Clintons forbid their daughter from seeing the boy again.

Rosemary and Tommy date without their parents knowing it. She appeals to his better nature, persuading Tommy to go to college and perhaps become a doctor like his dad. But after a bully called Rock picks a fight with him, Tommy ends up bloodied. Then he and Rosemary are caught together by her father, who slaps her. Rosemary runs away, but Tommy convinces her that no one can keep them apart.

Cast 
Lili Gentle as Rosemary Clinton
Mark Damon as Tommy Price
Edward Binns as Dr. Price
Frances Mercer as Mrs. Price
George Brenlin as Weasel Martin
Connie Stevens as Candy
Jered Barclay as Stretch Grass 
Danny Welton as Bones
William Stevens as Rock
Joan Bradshaw as Carhop
Dabbs Greer as Mr. John Clinton
Shirley Falls as Rock's girl
Ann Doran as Mrs. Clara Clinton
Kim Scala as Party girl

Release
The film was released on a double bill with Rockabilly Baby also directed by Claxton.

References

External links 
 

1957 films
1950s English-language films
20th Century Fox films
American drama films
1957 drama films
Films scored by Paul Dunlap
Films directed by William F. Claxton
1950s American films